Cypriot cuisine is the cuisine of the island of Cyprus, shared by both Greek Cypriots and Turkish Cypriots.

Food preparation
Frequently used ingredients are fresh vegetables such as courgettes (zucchini), olives, okra, green beans, artichokes, carrots, tomatoes, cucumbers, lettuce and grape leaves, and pulses such as beans (for fasolada), broad beans, peas, black-eyed beans, chickpeas and lentils. Pears, apples, grapes, oranges, Mandarin oranges, nectarines, mespila, blackberries, cherries, strawberries, figs, watermelon, melon, avocado, citrus, lemon, pistachio, almond, chestnut, walnut, hazelnut are some of the commonest of the fruits and nuts.

The best-known spices and herbs include pepper, parsley, rocket (arugula), celery, fresh coriander (cilantro), thyme, and oregano. Traditionally, cumin and coriander seeds make up the main cooking aromas of the island. Mint is a very important herb in Cyprus. It grows abundantly, and locals use it for everything, particularly in dishes containing ground meat. For example, the Cypriot version of pastitsio (locally known as macaronia tou fournou or  makarna fırında) contains very little tomato and generous amounts of mint. The same is true of keftedes or köfte (meatballs), which are sometimes laced with mint to provide a contrast with the meat. Potato is also often used in making keftedes. Fresh coriander or cilantro is another commonly used herb. It is often used in salads, olive breads, spinach pies (spanakopita or ispanak böreği) and other pastries. In some regions of the island it is also used to flavour hot dishes, particularly tomato-based ones, such as yiachnista.

Meats grilled over charcoal are known as souvla, souvlaki or şiş, named after the skewers on which they are prepared. Most commonly these are pork, kid, beef, lamb or chicken and sheftalia, but grilled halloumi cheese, mushrooms, and, uniquely to the Greek Cypriots, loukaniko (pork sausages) are also served. They are typically stuffed into a pita or wrapped in a thin flatbread, along with a salad of cabbage, parsley, thinly sliced onions, tomatoes and sliced cucumber. Although less popular than souvlaki and sheftalia, gyros are also commonly eaten. Gyros (also known as döner) have grilled meat slices instead of chunks, and the taste differs from that of souvlaki due to the salad and dressings added. Gyros are made from various cuts of lamb, pork, or chicken, and sometimes but rarely beef.

Bulgur is the traditional carbohydrate other than bread. It is often steamed with tomato and onion; a few strands of vermicelli pasta are often added to provide a texture, fragrance, colour and flavour contrast. Along with bulgur, natural yogurt is a staple. Wheat and yogurt come together in the traditional peasant meal of tarhana/trahanas, a way of preserving milk in which the cracked wheat is steamed, mixed with sour milk, dried, and stored. Small amounts reheated in water or broth provide a nourishing and tasty meal, especially with added cubes of aged halloumi. A hollow is made through the cigar and a mixture of minced meat, onions, parsley and cinnamon is packed. After sealing the meat mixture inside the cigar they are deep-fried before serving with lemon juice.

For Greek Cypriots, there are many fasting days defined by the Orthodox Church, and though not everyone adheres, many do. On these days, effectively all animal products must not be consumed. Pulses are eaten instead, sometimes cooked in tomato sauce, but more usually simply prepared and dressed with olive oil and lemon. On some days, even olive oil is not allowed. These meals often consist of raw onion, raw garlic, and dried red chili which is munched along with these austere dishes to add a variety of taste, though this practice is dying out.

Dishes

Seafood
Popular seafood dishes include calamari, octopus, cuttlefish, red mullet, sea bass, and gilt-head bream. Octopus, due to its peculiar taste and texture, is made into a stiffado, a stew with red wine, carrots, tomatoes, and onions. Calamari is either cut into rings and fried in batter or is stuffed whole with rice, cumin, cloves, sometimes adding mint to the stuffing, and then baked or grilled. Cuttlefish may be cooked like calamari or like octopus in red wine with onions. It is sometimes prepared with spinach, but without adding garden peas, which are a popular accompaniment for cuttlefish in Turkey (specially in west and south coast), some parts of Greece, and Italy. Calamari, octopus, and cuttlefish commonly feature in meze, a spread of small dishes served as an extensive set of entrées.

The most traditional fish is salt cod, which up until very recently was baked in the outdoor beehive ovens with potatoes and tomatoes in season. Gilt-head bream is popular because it is relatively inexpensive and like sea bass extensively farmed. Until recently, salted herrings bought whole out of wooden barrels were a staple food. They are still enjoyed, but not as much now, as fresh fish and meat are regular alternatives.

Many fish restaurants also include in the fish meze a variety of different food which include fish, for example fish souffle and fish croquettes.

Vegetables
Cyprus potatoes are long and waxy with a unique taste, exported internationally. Locals love them baked in the oven, preferably the outdoor beehive fourni. Many Cypriots add salt, cumin, oregano, and some finely sliced onion. When they barbecue, some Cypriots put potatoes into foil and sit them in the charcoal to make them like jacket potatoes, served with butter or as a side dish to salad and meat.

Salad vegetables are eaten at every meal, sometimes whole. More often, they are prepared chopped, sliced, and dressed with lemon and olive oil. In the summer, the usual salad is of celery leaves and stalks, parsley, coriander leaves, tomatoes, and cucumber. Summer purslane is very popular as are wild dandelion leaves.

In the early spring, artichokes are in season. Cypriots eat the leaves by detaching and biting off the fleshy base. A common preparation for the stalks and the heart is braised with garden peas, with a little onion and perhaps a chopped tomato. Meat is sometimes added.

Okra is baked in the oven with tomato and oil, and cauliflower is also given this treatment. Cauliflower is also made into , a sour pickle covered with a marinade of vinegar, yeast, and mustard seeds. It is also cooked in tomato sauce, onions and mince meat.

Aubergines can be prepared in a variety of ways, including stuffed and in moussaka. They are commonly fried and stewed slowly in oil, where the cooking time brings out the flavour and also allows them to shed the oil they have absorbed. Turkish Cypriots hollow them, fry them, stuff them with tomatoes and garlic or mince meat and tomato paste, cook them in the oven and garnish with parsley.

Pasta 
Makarónia tou foúrnou (Greek: μακαρόνια του φούρνου, Turkish: magarina fırında, English: oven macaroni) recipes vary, but usually the meat sauce in the middle is made of pork, beef or lamb, tomatoes are only sometimes used, and it is flavoured with mint, parsley or cinnamon. The top is sprinkled with grated halloumi or anari cheese, though cheese is sometimes added only to the white sauce. The traditional pasta shape for this dish is bucatini. This dish is also referred to as pastitsio.

Magarına bulli is a traditional Cypriot meal made of bucatini pasta and chicken. This dish is widely known as being one of the national dishes of Cyprus. Chicken is often boiled in water which is then used as the stock to cook the pasta. When the pasta and chicken are cooked the pasta is often topped with lemon juice, grated halloumi cheese and dried mint.

Meat

Prior to Cyprus' urbanisation, Cypriots traditionally ate fresh meat on weekends. This was usually a boiled chicken, served with a starch (usually pasta or bulgur) cooked in its juices. This would stretch the meat to enable the whole family to eat. Other fresh meat dishes were only enjoyed occasionally, sometimes en masse as a feast such as a wedding. Now, as people are better off and meat is widely available, traditional meat dishes are enjoyed frequently.

Afelia, when well prepared, is a saute of pork, red wine, and coriander seeds. Psito is large chunks of meat and potatoes cooked in the oven. Plenty of fat is used in its preparation; traditionally, this would have been rendered pig fat, but now sunflower oil is used. Olive oil is used as a dressing for salads, vegetables, and pulses but is not used to cook meat dishes.

Preserved pork is very popular, and before refrigeration, it was the main source of red meat available to Cypriots. Before refrigeration became widespread in the 19th century it was tradition to throw away the preserved pork in summertime. Cypriots also add red wine; therefore, there is a characteristic flavour to most of the charcuterie from the island.

Lountza is made from the pork tenderloin. After the initial brining and marinading in wine, it is smoked. Although it can be aged, many prefer younger, milder lountza. It is often cooked over coals or fried with eggs to act as a sandwich filler or as part of a meze. The shoulder of a freshly slaughtered animal is cut into chunks about the size of an almond along with a smaller quantity of chopped back fat, which are marinated in wine and brined, stuffed into intestines, and smoked as sausages (loukaniko).

A traditional practice that is dying out fast is to render pig fat for use as a cooking medium and a preservative. Loukaniko and also chunks of fried salted pork meat and fat can be stored in earthenware jars submerged in the lard for a long time, even in the heat of the island.

Lamb and goat meat is also preserved as tsamarella, made very salty to prevent the fatty lamb meat from going rancid. Very popular amongst both communities is preserved beef. The whole silversides and briskets are salted and spiced quite powerfully to make pastourma/bastirma. The same meat and some fat is chopped finely and made into pastourma-loukaniko sausages.

Many Cypriots consider snails a delicacy. Snails are in season in late autumn, when the first good rains arrive after the hot summer. The most popular way to prepare snails is to barbecue them. Another popular variation is to cook them with onions, garlic and tomatoes.

Meze
Mezedes is a large selection of dishes with small helpings of varied foods, brought to the table as a progression of tastes and textures. The meal begins with black and green olives, tahini, skordalia (potato and garlic dip), humus, taramosalata (fish roe dip), and tzatziki/çaçık (ttalattouri in Cypriot), all served with chunks of fresh bread and a bowl of mixed salad. Bunches of greens, some raw, some dressed with lemon juice and salt, are a basic feature of the meze table. The meal continues with fish, grilled halloumi cheese, lountza (smoked pork tenderloin), keftedes (minced meatballs), sheftalia (pork rissoles), and loukaniko (pork sausages). Hot grilled meats – kebabs, lamb chops, chicken – may be served toward the end. The dessert is usually fresh fruit or glyka – traditional sugar-preserved fruits and nuts.

Desserts
Loukoumades (fried doughballs in syrup), loukoum, ravani, tulumba and baklava are well-known local desserts. There are also pastiș, cookies made of ground almonds, that are offered to guests at weddings.

Flaounes are savoury Easter pastries that contain goats cheese (or a variety of cheeses), eggs, spices and herbs all wrapped in a yeast pastry, then brushed with egg yolk and dipped into sesame seeds.

The fruit is soaked for two weeks (depending upon the fruit) then boiled with sugar until the correct texture is obtained.

Sweet syrups and spreads include soumada made from almonds. Soumada has a very ancient history in Cyprus, stretching back into the Roman period, and it was given as an exotic eastern delicacy by King Peter I of Cyprus to King Casimir the Great of Poland at the Congress of Kraków, held in Poland in 1364. Also popular is mahalepi, a kind of blancmange made from corn flour usually flavoured with rose water or mahlep.

Cyprus delights, or loukoumia, are one of Cyprus's protected geographical indication (PGI) by the European Union. It is a family of confections based on a gel of starch and sugar, flavored with lemon, rose water, mastic or other fruits with or without chopped dates, pistachios and hazelnuts or walnuts bound by the gel. The main centres for its production are Yeroskipou near Paphos and Pano Lefkara near Larnaca. A similar looking sweet is soujouk or shoushouko, although it is made very differently from loukoumia, being produced from boiled grape juice.

The 10th of September is considered Cypriot dessert day, where friends and families share homemade desserts.

Cheeses
Halloumi is a semi-hard white-brined cheese with elastic texture, made in a rectangular shape from a mixture of goat and sheep milk; it may be sliced and eaten fresh, grilled, or fried. Aged halloumi may be grated over pasta dishes.  It is the national cheese of Cyprus.

Anari is a crumbly fresh whey cheese, similar to ricotta, made from goat or sheep milk. Two varieties exist, dry and fresh anari. Dry anari is salted and is much harder than the fresh variety, and is served grated with pasta dishes and giouvetsi, while fresh anari is eaten in slices with honey or carob syrup.

Halitzia is a feta-like cheese made from goat or sheep milk. It is a slightly sour-flavored cheese, which is produced in the villages of the area of Tylliria. It can be enjoyed in salads.

Drinks

Non-alcoholic
Ayran is a traditional drink made of yoghurt. Its recipe varies from region to region.
Triantafyllo, a thick concentrated dark pink syrup (rose cordial) made from the extract of the Cyprus (Damascus) rose, has water or milk added to make a refreshing sweet cordial, especially in summer. It is distinct from rodostagma (literally "rose drops") (rose water) and anthonero (blossom water), which are used to sweeten mahallepi and other sweetmeats.

Alcoholic
Among Cypriots traditional brandy and zivania are of the most popular drinks on the island. The second popular drink is beer. The local breweries of KEO and Carlsberg command the lion's share of the market. In Northern Cyprus, Efes is the most widely sold. Evidence of wine production on Cyprus goes back for millennia. Commandaria, the oldest wine in continuous production, is a popular dessert wine.

Cyprus also has a tradition of brandy production, with production by various Limassol-based distilleries since 1871. Cypriot brandy is commonly drunk with meze dishes, and forms the base for the distinctive brandy sour cocktail, developed on the island in the late 1930s. Zivania, a grape distillate similar to Cretan raki, is another popular spirit.

See also
Ttalattouri
Vaticaniot cuisine

Gallery

References

Further reading

External links
Traditional Cyprus Recipes
Cyprus Food Museum

 
Middle Eastern cuisine
Greek cuisine
Turkish cuisine